Roland Ravatomanga (born August 13, 1951 in Miarinarivo) is a Malagasy politician. He is a member of the Senate of Madagascar for Bongolava, a Minister of Agriculture, and is a member of the Tiako I Madagasikara party.

External links
 Delegation headed by M. Roland RAVATOMANGA, Minister of Agriculture for an Official Visit to Japan

1951 births
Living people
Members of the Senate (Madagascar)
Tiako I Madagasikara politicians